Jabed Khan is a Bangladeshi footballer plays as a striker for Fortis FC in the Bangladesh Premier League.

References

1996 births
Living people
Bangladeshi footballers
Bangladesh international footballers
Association football forwards
People from Narsingdi District
Saif SC players
Sheikh Jamal Dhanmondi Club players